No. 360 Squadron RAF was an electronic countermeasures (ECM) squadron of the Royal Air Force.

History
The squadron was created from the merger of the personnel of 831 Naval Air Squadron of the Fleet Air Arm (previously operating the Fairey Gannet ECM.6) and 'B' Flight, No. 97 Squadron RAF (flying English Electric Canberras) at RAF Watton on 1 April 1966. Initially it was known as Joint Electronic Warfare Trials and Training Force before being given its official designation of No. 360 [RN/RAF] Squadron on 23 September 1966. The squadron flew a number of Canberra types: B.2s, T.4s (for pilot training); a B.6; PR.7s and E.17s. The first Canberra T.17 was delivered just before Christmas 1966 and this type soldiered on until disbandment in 1994.

A sister squadron, No. 361 Squadron RAF was also formed in January 1967 for deployment to the Far East. However, following the 1967 Defence Review, 361 Squadron became redundant and was officially disbanded in July the same year.

No. 360 Squadron moved to RAF Cottesmore in April 1969. The official squadron badge was awarded in 1973: the trident represents the Royal Navy involvement, whilst the moth (of the species Melese laodamia) depicts the unique role of the Squadron (this particular moth avoids predatory bats by jamming their prey-finding "radar" system). 360 Squadron moved again in September 1975 to RAF Wyton where it remained until being disbanded in October 1994, its work being taken over by Flight Refuelling Ltd.

In 1991 360 Squadron achieved 25 years of service, and was presented with a Squadron Standard. No. 360 Squadron had many unique aspects: its role, its number had not been previously issued, and it is the only squadron to have been formed, awarded a Standard, and disbanded during Queen Elizabeth II's reign.

Aircraft operated

Squadron bases

See also
list of RAF squadrons

References

Notes

Bibliography

External links

 
 

360 Squadron
Electronic warfare units and formations
Military units and formations established in 1966
Military units and formations disestablished in 1994